Edmonton Centre is a federal electoral district in Alberta, Canada, that has been represented in the House of Commons of Canada from 1968 to 1979 and since 2004.

Geography
The riding is anchored in the heart of Downtown Edmonton. It also includes Spruce Avenue, Rossdale, Central McDougall, Prince Rupert, Oliver, Queen Mary Park, Westwood, Prince Charles, Sherbrooke, Dovercourt, Woodcroft, Inglewood, Westmount, North Glenora, Glenora, McQueen, Grovenor, Gagnon Estate, Canora, High Park, Crestwood, Jasper Park, Parkview, Laurier Heights, Lynnwood, Patricia Heights, Rio Terrace, and Quesnell Heights.

In geographic terms, Edmonton Centre is bounded by the North Saskatchewan River and Whitemud Drive to the south, 97 Street to the east, Alberta Highway 16 and CN Rail line to the north, and 156 Street to the west.

History
The electoral district was originally created in 1966 from Edmonton East and Edmonton West ridings.

It was abolished in 1976, with parts of it being transferred to Edmonton North, Edmonton East and Edmonton West ridings.

In was re-created in 2003 from Edmonton West, Edmonton Southwest and a small part of Edmonton Centre-East.

Edmonton Centre lost territory to Edmonton West and gained territory from Edmonton—Spruce Grove during the 2012 electoral redistribution.

Members of Parliament
This riding has elected the following Members of Parliament:

Current Member of Parliament
Randy Boissonnault of the Liberal Party has represented the riding in Parliament since the 2021 Canadian federal election.

Election results

Edmonton Centre (2003-present)

Edmonton Centre (1968–1979)

See also
 List of Canadian federal electoral districts
 Past Canadian electoral districts
 Edmonton Centre provincial electoral district.

References
 
 
 
 Expenditures - 2008
 Expenditures - 2004

Notes

Alberta federal electoral districts
Politics of Edmonton